Edward Gilbert Abbott (1825–1855) was the patient upon whom William T. G. Morton first publicly demonstrated the use of ether as a surgical anesthetic.  The operation was done in an amphitheater at the Massachusetts General Hospital now known as the Ether Dome on 16 October 1846.  After Morton administered the ether, surgeon John Collins Warren removed a portion of a tumor from Abbott's neck. After Warren had finished, and Abbott regained consciousness, Warren asked the patient how he felt. Reportedly, Abbott said, "Feels as if my neck's been scratched." Warren then turned to his medical audience and uttered "Gentlemen, this is no Humbug." This was presumably a reference to the unsuccessful demonstration of nitrous oxide anesthesia by Horace Wells in the same theater the previous year, which was ended by cries of "Humbug!" after the patient groaned with pain.

References

External links
 Edward Gilbert Abbott:  Enigmatic Figure of the Ether Demonstration
 The Day Pain Died
 Dr John Collins Warren ( 1778-1856 )
 Dr William Thomas Green Morton ( 1819 – 68 )

1825 births
1855 deaths
History of anesthesia